Carlos Rodríguez Chaires (born 8 August 1994) is a Mexican footballer who plays as a midfielder. He is currently a free agent.

Career
Rodríguez's first senior club was Celaya, who he spent time with in his youth career. He made his professional debut with Celaya on 6 March 2013, featuring for the final twenty minutes of a 3–3 draw in the Copa MX against Mérida; having previously been an unused substitute for a match with the same opponents a week prior. In the following September, Rodríguez began playing for the club's reserve team in the third tier of Mexican football. He departed Celaya after one goal, versus Cachorros on 1 February 2014, in ten matches for their reserves.

Career statistics
.

References

External links

1994 births
Living people
People from Celaya
Mexican footballers
Association football forwards
Ascenso MX players
Liga Premier de México players
Club Celaya footballers
Celaya F.C. Premier players